Adhaim Dam is a multi-purpose embankment dam on the Al Uzaym (Adhaim) River 133 km northeast of Baghdad, Iraq. The purpose of the dam is flood control, hydro-power and irrigation. The dam was completed in 2000 with only the embankment, spillway and intake. The power station and irrigation outlets are unfinished. When complete, the power station will have a 27 MW installed capacity and the irrigation outlet will be able to discharge .

See also

List of dams and reservoirs in Iraq

References

Dams in Iraq
Hydroelectric power stations in Iraq
Embankment dams
Saladin Governorate
Dams completed in 2000
2000 establishments in Iraq